Dave Solomon (1952 – August 6, 2011) was a Connecticut sportswriter and newspaper columnist.

Originally from the Bronx, Solomon was graduated from the University of Connecticut in 1974. He was sports editor of the university's newspaper Daily Campus, and at the same time wrote for the Hartford Times. He moved to the New Haven Register in 1976, for which he covered sports for the next 35 years. Eventually he became a columnist, regularly contributing under the title I Was Thinking.

A member of the Pro Football Writers of America and the Baseball Writers' Association of America, Solomon was honored by the Associated Press and the Society of Professional Journalists, and received the Bill Keish Award for media service to the Walter Camp Football Foundation.

Senator Joe Lieberman called Solomon a "Connecticut journalistic institution."

Notes

References
 Dave Solomon was New Haven Register sports columnist, Jewish Ledger, August 10, 2011
 State Loses An Essential Sports Voice With Death Of Dave Solomon , Hartford Courant, August 8, 2011

External links
 To know Dave Solomon was to truly admire him, New Haven Register, August 8, 2011
 For My Friend, Dave Solomon, Hartford Courant, August 7, 2011

1952 births
2011 deaths
Writers from New Haven, Connecticut
Journalists from New York City
Sportswriters from New York (state)
American columnists
American male journalists
Jewish American writers
21st-century American Jews